WNT1-inducible-signaling pathway protein 2, or WISP-2 (also named CCN5) is a matricellular protein that in humans is encoded by the WISP2 gene.

Function 

The CCN family of proteins regulates diverse cellular functions, including cell adhesion, migration, proliferation, differentiation.

Structure 

WISP-2 is a member of the CCN family (CCN intercellular signaling protein) of secreted, extracellular matrix (ECM)-associated signaling matricellular proteins. The CCN acronym is derived from the first three members of the family identified, namely CYR61 (CCN1), CTGF (connective tissue growth factor, or CCN2), and NOV. These proteins, together with WISP1/CCN4, WISP2 (CCN5, this gene), and WISP3 (CCN6) comprise the six-member CCN family in vertebrates. CCN proteins characteristically contain an N-terminal secretory signal peptide followed by four structurally distinct domains with homologies to insulin-like growth factor binding protein (IGFBP), von Willebrand type C repeats (vWC), thrombospondin type 1 repeat (TSR), and a cysteine knot motif within the C-terminal (CT) domain. However, WISP-2 is unique among this family of proteins by lacking precisely the CT domain.

Clinical significance 

WISP-2 (CCN5) inhibits the proliferation of vascular smooth muscle cells, human uterine myometrial cells, and leiomyoma cells. Ectopic expression of WISP-2 also inhibits the motility and invasiveness of breast carcinoma cells. WISP-2 also inhibits cardiac hypertrophy and fibrosis, an effect that appears linked to the absence of the CT domain.

References 

CCN proteins